Sherry Hawco (February 17, 1964 – October 26, 1991) was a Canadian gymnast.

Hawco competed at the 1978 Commonwealth Games where she won a gold medal in the women's team event and a silver medal in the women's all-around event. She also won two gold medals at the 1979 Pan American Games in the beam and women's team events. She suffered a knee injury in 1981 and retired from gymnastics in 1982.

Hawco underwent surgery for breast cancer in 1990 but stopped having chemotherapy after learning she was pregnant. She died on  October 26, 1991, 7 weeks after giving birth to her son, Brandon. She was inducted into the Cambridge Sports Hall of Fame in 1997.

References

1964 births
1991 deaths
Canadian female artistic gymnasts
Gymnasts at the 1978 Commonwealth Games
Commonwealth Games medallists in gymnastics
Commonwealth Games gold medallists for Canada
Commonwealth Games silver medallists for Canada
Pan American Games medalists in gymnastics
Pan American Games gold medalists for Canada
Gymnasts at the 1979 Pan American Games
Medalists at the 1979 Pan American Games
20th-century Canadian women
Medallists at the 1978 Commonwealth Games